is a Japanese football player. He plays for Nara Club.

Club statistics
Updated to 20 February 2017.

References

External links

Profile at Nara Club
j-league

1988 births
Living people
Chukyo University alumni
Association football people from Aichi Prefecture
Japanese footballers
J2 League players
J3 League players
Japan Football League players
Sagan Tosu players
Yokohama FC players
SC Sagamihara players
Nara Club players
Association football defenders
Universiade bronze medalists for Japan
Universiade medalists in football
Medalists at the 2009 Summer Universiade